Cossonay District was a district of the Canton of Vaud, Switzerland. The seat of the district was the town of Cossonay.  It was dissolved on 31 August 2006.

Mergers and name changes
 On 1 January 1999 the former municipalities of Villars-Lussery and Lussery merged to form the new municipality of Lussery-Villars.  
 On 1 September 2006 the municipalities of Bettens, Bournens, Boussens, Daillens, Lussery-Villars, Mex (VD), Penthalaz, Penthaz, Sullens and Vufflens-la-Ville came from the District de Cossonay to join the Gros-de-Vaud District.  
 On 1 September 2006 the municipalities of La Chaux (Cossonay), Chavannes-le-Veyron, Chevilly, Cossonay, Cottens (VD), Cuarnens, Dizy, Eclépens, Ferreyres, Gollion, Grancy, L'Isle, Mauraz, Moiry, Mont-la-Ville, Montricher, Orny, Pampigny, Pompaples, La Sarraz, Senarclens and Sévery  came from the District de Cossonay to join the Morges District.

Municipalities

References

Former districts of the canton of Vaud